This is a list of cities, towns and villages in Barbados. Barbados is a sovereign island country in the Lesser Antilles, in the Americas. Barbados is divided into 11 parishes.

Christ Church 

 Atlantic Shores
 Bannatyne
 Blue Waters
 Boarded Hall
 Briggs
 Callenders
 Cane Vale
 Chancery Lane
 Charnocks
 Clapham
 Edey
 Hastings
 Hopewell
 Maxwell
 Maxwell Hill
 Newton Terrace
 Oistins
 Rockley
 Scarborough
 Seawell
 Saint Lawrence
 Welches
 Woman's Bay
 Worthing
 Wotton
 Yorkshire

Saint Andrew 

 Barclays Park
 Baxters
 Belleplaine
 Breedy's
 Bruce Vale
 Chalky Mount
 Cherry Tree Hill
 Greenland
 Hillaby
 Turner's Hall Woods – park and nature reserve
 White Hill

Saint George 

 Bairds
 Belair
 Brighton
 Bulkeley
 Bulkely Factory
 Campaign Castle
 Church View
 Constant
 Drax Hall – sugar was first cultivated in Barbados in the 1640s at Drak Hall
 Ellerton
 Gun Hill
 Newbury

Saint James 

 Apes Hill
 Appleby
 Carlton
 Holetown
 Lower Carlton
 Mount Standfast
 Oxnards Crescent
 Thorpe
 Upper Carlton
 West Terrace

Saint John 

 Bath
 Bowmanston
 Cherry Grove
 Coach Hill
 Gall Hill
 Glebe Land
 Hohtersal
 Kendal
 Mount Tabor
 Saint Marks
 Saint Margaret's)
 Sherbourne
 Venture
 Messiah Street

Saint Joseph 

 Airy Hill
 Bathsheba
 Bissex
 Blackmans
 Bonwell
 Branchbury
 Buckden House
 Cambridge
 Canefield
 Castle Grant
 Cattlewash
 Chimborazo
 Hackleton's Cliff
 Horse Hill
 Sugar Hill

Saint Lucy 

 Alexandra
 Allmans
 Archers
 Babbs
 Bishops
 Blacksage Alley
 Benthams
 Bourbon
 Bromefield
 Cave Hill
 Chance Hall
 Checker Hall
 Church Hill
 Cove Bay
 Crab Hill
 Friendship
 Grave Yard
 Lamberts
 Little Bay
 Nesfield
 Pie Corner
 River Bay
 Spring Hall

Saint Michael 

 Bank Hall
 Gay
 Belfield
 Belle
 Bibbys Lane
 Black Rock
 Bridgetown (110,000) – the capital of Barbados
 Brighton
 Brittons Hill
 Bush Hall
 Canewood
 Carrington
 Cave Hill
 Clermont
 Codrington
 Dayrells
 Deacons
 Deacons Farm
 Eagle Hall
 Eden Lodge
 Fairfield
 Fontabelle
 Friendship
 Friendship Terrace
 Goodland
 Grazettes
 Green Hill
 Haggatt Hall
 Harmony Hall
 Henrys
 Highgate
 Hothersal Turning
 Howells
 Ivy
 Jackmans
 Kew
 Lazarette
 Lodge Hill
 Lower Estate
 Mapp Hill
 Neils
 Pine Hill
 Prospect
 Rock Dundo
 Rouen
 Spring Garden
 Station Hill
 St Barnabas
 Two Mile Hill
 Upton
 Wanstead
 Warrens
 Waterford
 Whitehall
 Wildey

Saint Peter 

 Alleynedale
 Ashburton Grove, The Castle
 Ashton Hall
 Bakers
 Battleys
 Black Bess
 Boscobelle
 The Castle
 Diamond Corner
 Farley Hill
 Fourhill
 French Village
 Gibbes
 Haymans
 Indian Ground
 Mile and a Quarter
 Mangrove Terrace
 Mullins Terrace
 Portland
 Road View
 Rock Hall
 Rose Hill
 Six Mens
 Speightstown (3,600) – the second-largest town centre of Barbados
 Sunbury
 The Whim

Saint Philip 

 Bayfield
 Bayleys
 Bel Air
 Bentleys
 Blades
 Blades Hill
 Brereton
 Bushy Park
 Carrington
 Caveland
 Church Village
 Foul Bay
 Four Roads
 Kirtons
 Mangrove
 Marchfield
 Ragged Point
 Saint Martins
 Six Cross Roads
 Sunbury
 The Crane
 Three Houses
 Woodbourne
 Workhall
 Rices
 Rock Hall
 Gemswick
 Harlington
 Heddings
 Foul Bay

Saint Thomas 

 Allen View
 Applewhaites
 Arch Hall
 Arthurs Seat
 Bagatelle
 Bennetts
 Bloomsbury
 Blowers
 Bridgefield
 Cane Garden
 Carrington
 Chapman
 Christie
 Edge Hill Heights #1
 Hopewell
 Welchman Hall

Unsorted
 Congaline
 Husbands

See also 

 Parishes of Barbados
 List of schools in Barbados
 List of cities by country
 List of towns

References

External links 

 Barbados Towns and Places of Interest

 
Cities, towns and village
Barbados
Barbados
Barbados
Barbados